La Baize is a river in northwestern France, crossing the departments of Orne and Calvados. It is 25.72 km long. Its source is in Habloville, and it flows into the river Orne at the border between the communes of Les Isles-Bardel and Rapilly, at the end of the Baize valley.

Tributaries

A list of the major tributaries of La Baize:

La Bilaine
Le Bezeron
Le Boulaire
Ruisseau du Val Lienard
Ruisseau du Val
Ruisseau de la Fontaine Andre
Ruisseau des Vallees
Ruisseau des Vaux Viets

Fauna and Flaura

The rocky and stoney bed with good water quality makes the Baize a good habitat for spawning Atlantic salmon and Sea trout, as well as River Trout and white-clawed crayfish

References

Rivers of France
Rivers of Normandy
Rivers of Calvados (department)
Rivers of Orne